Stevie Gill (born September 8, 1973) is a Canadian former soccer player who played in the Canadian Soccer League, American Professional Soccer League, Canadian International Soccer League, and Canadian Professional Soccer League.

After his retirement from soccer he began managing as an assistant coach in the CPSL, and later at the college level with Grand Canyon University.

Playing career 
Gill started his career in 1987 in the Canadian Soccer League with the Toronto Blizzard. He was traded to the Hamilton Steelers in 1991, and appeared in two playoff games. Once the season came to a conclusion Hamilton folded and he signed with the London Lasers. In 1993, he returned to the Toronto Blizzard which joined the American Professional Soccer League. During his tenure with Toronto he appeared in 10 matches. In 1994, he signed with Toronto Croatia in the Canadian International Soccer League, and won the league championship in 1995, and 1996.

In 2000, he competed in the Canadian Professional Soccer League with the Toronto Olympians. During his tenure with the Olympians he won the CPSL League Cup and the regular season championship. He featured in the CPSL Championship final against Toronto Croatia, but lost the match to a score of 2–1. The following season he was traded to the Durham Flames.

International career 
In 1991, he made his debut for the Canada men's national under-20 soccer team against Honduras at the 1991 Pan American Games. In total he would feature in eight matches, and participated in the 1992 CONCACAF U-20 Tournament.

Managerial career 
Gill would conclude his playing career with Durham in 2002, as he was assigned the position of assistant coach to Durham. In 2003, Gill was named the position of assistant coach to Grand Canyon University men's and women's soccer team. In 2008, he was appointed the Grand Canyon University women's soccer team head coach, and resigned in 2015

References 

1973 births
Living people
American Professional Soccer League players
Canadian National Soccer League players
Canadian Soccer League (1998–present) players
Canadian soccer coaches
Canadian soccer players
Hamilton Steelers (1981–1992) players
London Lasers players
Canadian Soccer League (1987–1992) players
Toronto Blizzard (1986–1993) players
Toronto Croatia players
Toronto (Mississauga) Olympians players
Soccer players from Toronto
Sportspeople from Scarborough, Toronto
Canada men's youth international soccer players
Pan American Games competitors for Canada
Footballers at the 1991 Pan American Games
Association football defenders